Harold Dewey Smith (June 6, 1898 – January 23, 1947) was an American civil servant who served as director of the United States Bureau of the Budget (now the Office of Management and Budget) during the Second World War.

Life and career
Born in Haven, Kansas, Smith was the son of James William Smith and his wife, Miranda, née Ebling. After serving in the United States Navy during the First World War, Smith attended the University of Kansas, where he earned a degree in engineering, and the University of Michigan, where he received an A.M. in public administration. Upon graduating from the University of Michigan, Smith returned to Kansas, where he worked for the League of Kansas Municipalities for three years. In 1928, Smith moved back to Michigan to serve as the first director of the Michigan Municipal League. From 1934 until 1937, he was also Director of Government at the University of Michigan.

In 1937, Smith left both the Michigan Municipal League and the University of Michigan to become the Budget Director for the state of Michigan. In 1939, he was selected by President Franklin D. Roosevelt to serve as the Director of the Bureau of the Budget. Smith served in that position for seven years, during which time he handled the enormous expansion of spending resulting from American participation in the Second World War. He resigned from the position in June 1946 to become the vice president of the International Bank for Reconstruction and Development, but died shortly thereafter in Culpeper, Virginia.  After his death, his widow donated all of his papers to the Franklin D. Roosevelt Presidential Library and Museum.  He is buried in Arlington National Cemetery, and had his sister's oldest son Donald L. Shannon, killed on his way home in 1945, buried next to him and his wife.

SMITH, HAROLD DEWEY

APPRENTICE SEAMAN U S NAVAL RES FORCE

DATE OF BIRTH: 06/06/1898

DATE OF DEATH: 01/23/1947

BURIED AT: SECTION 10 EH  SITE 11056 EH

ARLINGTON NATIONAL CEMETERY

Works
The Management of Your Government (1945)

References

Further reading
 Paul H. Appleby, "Harold D. Smith-Public Administrator" American Society for Public Administration
 Listing for the Harold D. Smith Papers at the Truman Library

External links
 

|-

1898 births
1947 deaths
People from Reno County, Kansas
Military personnel from Kansas
American civil servants
Directors of the Office of Management and Budget
Franklin D. Roosevelt administration personnel
Truman administration personnel
University of Kansas alumni
University of Michigan College of Engineering alumni